Atrina is a cosmopolitan genus of bivalve molluscs belonging to the family Pinnidae.

A typical species is A. fragilis, found in British waters. A. rigida (Lightfoot, 1786) is found on the southeast coast of North America and in the West Indies. The type species is A. nigra (Dillwyn, 1817, originally P. nigra).

Atrina is considered to represent the more primitive form within the Pinnidae; however, both genera Pinna and Atrina are very ancient. The genus Atrina is represented within the fossil record from the Triassic period to the Quaternary period (age range: 242.0 to 0.0 million years ago). These fossils have been found all over the world.

Description
Molluscs within this genus are characterized by elongated, wedge-shaped shells, distinguished from the genus Pinna by the lack of any grooves in the nacreous lining of the shell, and by the central positioning of the adductor scar.

As with other pen shells (Pinnidae) they commonly stand point-first in the sea bottom in which they live, anchored by net of byssus threads.

Species
Species within the genus Atrina include:

 Atrina affinis  Sowerby, 1821†
 Atrina argentea  Conrad, 1848†
 Atrina assimilis (Reeve, 1858)
 Atrina chautardi (Nicklès, 1953)
 Atrina chinensis (Deshayes, 1841)
 Atrina cumingii (Reeve, 1858)
 Atrina exusta (Gmelin, 1791)
 Atrina fragilis (Pennant, 1777) — fan mussel
 Atrina harrisii  Dall, 1898†
 Atrina hystrix (Hanley, 1858)
 Atrina inflata (Dillwyn, 1817)
 Atrina jacksoniana  Dall, 1898†
 Atrina japonica (Reeve, 1858)
 Atrina kinoshitai Habe, 1953
 Atrina lischkeana (Clessin, 1891)
 Atrina magellanica  Ihering, 1907†
 Atrina marquesana P. W. Schultz & M. Huber, 2013
 Atrina maura (G. B. Sowerby I, 1835)
 Atrina nigra (Dillwyn, 1817)
 Atrina oldroydii Dall, 1901
 Atrina pectinata (Linnaeus, 1767)
 Atrina penna (Reeve, 1858)
 Atrina pini P. W. Schultz & M. Huber, 2013
 Atrina piscatoria  Glenn, 1904†
 Atrina recta Dall, Bartsch & Rehder, 1938
 Atrina rigida (Lightfoot, 1786) — stiff pen shell
 Atrina rosenkrantzi Schnetler & M. S. Nielsen, 2018 †
 Atrina seminuda (Lamarck, 1819) — half-naked pen shell
 Atrina serra (Reeve, 1858)
 Atrina serrata (Sowerby, 1825) — saw-toothed pen shell
 Atrina squamifera (Sowerby, 1835)
 Atrina stephensi  Hanna, 1926†
 Atrina strangei (Reeve, 1858)
 Atrina talarensis  Olsson, 1928†
 Atrina tasmanica (Tenison Woods, 1876)
 Atrina teramachii Habe, 1953
 Atrina texta Hertlein, Hanna & A. M. Strong, 1943
 Atrina tuberculosa (G. B. Sowerby I, 1835)
 Atrina vexillum (Born, 1778) — flag pen shell
 Atrina zelandica (Gray in Yate, 1835) — the horse mussel

References

External links
idscaro.net — images

Pinnidae
Bivalve genera
Taxa named by John Edward Gray